Alexander Mayer may refer to:

 Sandy Mayer (born 1952), US tennis player
 Alexander Mayer (ice hockey)
 Alexander Mayer (swimmer), West German swimmer in the 1988 Summer Olympics
 Alexander Mayer (motorcyclist), Austrian motorcyclist who competed in the 1953 Grand Prix motorcycle racing season

See also
Alexander Meyer (disambiguation)